Charles Huntington may refer to:

Charles Pratt Huntington (1871–1919), American architect
Charles A. Huntington (1891–1973), American football player
Sir Charles Huntington, 1st Baronet (died 1907), British Member of Parliament for Darwen
Charles W. Huntington (1854–?), American Congregational minister